Anna Baumgart (born 1966) is a Polish artist, best known for her large installation pieces and film. She is based in Warsaw. While she covers many different issues in her works, "all of them share a preoccupation with repression." Her works are in the permanent collections of several Polish museums.

Early life and education
Baumgart was born in Wroclaw in 1966.

In 1994 Baumgart graduated from the department of sculpture of the Academy of Fine Arts in Gdańsk.

Career

Themes
Baumgart uses historiography to examine the past and reexamine it through art. She has also explored how the media can shape the narrative of a historical moment by reducing it to a single iconography. Szum Magazine writes that Baumgart likes to play with history and themes in culture.

Baumgart also examines issues related to gender, such as how to redefine the "notion of 'hysteria.'" She is interested in examining roles relating to motherhood and the system as they shape the mental development of a child.

Work
In her work, Let Unrestrained Anger Be Eliminated (1996), Baumgart uses technology and the human body to explore the "resonance between maleness and femaleness." she explores the roles of how a child's development is shaped and whether it is through the mother or society in Who's Talking? (1998). Her work, I've Got It From My Mother (2002) uses myths and symbols in the photographic and sculptural works of the artist and her daughter.

Baumgart uses found footage to create Real? (The Cranes Are Flying)  (2001).  Baumgart's first staged film was Ecstatics, Hysterics and Other Saintly Ladies (2004) and premiered at the Zachęta National Gallery. The film project, Fresh Cherries (2010) examines prostitution in concentration camps.

In 2010, Baumgart collaborated with artist, Agnieszka Kurant, to create Project (...) which is an installation that spanned Chlodna street where there was once a footbridge linking Jewish communities to one another during World War II.
 Mother (1999),
 Condoms, Money, Lady - No problem! (Prezerwatywy, pieniądze, money, lady - no problem, 1999)

Major exhibitions
 Media Art Biennale in 1997 and 1999, At The Time of Writing
 Centre for Contemporary Art Zamek Ujazdowski in Warsaw, 1998
 Public Relations, CCA Łaźnia in Gdańsk, 1999

Public collections
 Zachęta National Gallery of Art
 Silesian Museum in Katowice
 Fonds Régional d’Art Contemporain Poitou-Charentes

References

Citations

Sources

External links
 

1966 births
Artists from Warsaw
Film people from Wrocław
Polish women artists
Polish film directors
Living people
Academy of Fine Arts in Gdańsk alumni